Cathedral of Saint Joseph may refer to:

 Cathedral of St. Joseph (Hartford, Connecticut)
 Cathedral of Saint Joseph (Jefferson City, Missouri)
 Cathedral of Saint Joseph (Sioux Falls, South Dakota)
 Cathedral of Saint Joseph (Wheeling, West Virginia)

See also 
 St. Joseph's Cathedral (disambiguation)